Paul David Caligiuri (born March 9, 1964) is an American former soccer player who played as a defensive midfielder.

Caligiuri's professional career spanned 16 years, during which he played for numerous teams in the United States and Germany, and for the U.S. national team. During his 14 years as a defender and defensive midfielder with the national team, he earned 110 caps and scored five goals.

Caligiuri is best remembered for his game-winning goal widely dubbed the "Shot heard round the world," which he scored in a 1–0 World Cup qualifier victory over Trinidad and Tobago on November 19, 1989. The victory qualified the United States for the 1990 FIFA World Cup in Italy, its first World Cup berth since 1950. There Caligiuri notched the first World Cup goal for the U.S. national team in 40 years, scoring in a 5–1 defeat against Czechoslovakia. He is a member of the National Soccer Hall of Fame.

High school and college
Caligiuri was born in Westminster, California. After graduating from Walnut High School, he attended UCLA from 1982 to 1985.  During his four seasons with the Bruins, he was twice named an NCAA All-American. He also captained the Bruins to an NCAA Championship his junior year.

Club career

San Diego Nomads
After graduating from UCLA, Caligiuri played the 1986 season with the San Diego Nomads of the Western Soccer Alliance, earning the league's Most Valuable Player award. He was also named the 1986 U.S. Soccer Athlete of the Year.

Germany
Caligiuri's rookie professional accomplishments attracted the attention of German Bundesliga club Hamburger SV, who signed him after his appearance in the 1986 FIFA/UNICEF All Star Game.

In 1988, Hamburg transferred Caligiuri to SV Meppen of the German 2. Bundesliga, where he played for two seasons. From Meppen, he moved to FC Hansa Rostock in East Germany, with whom he would win the East German professional championship. From 1991 to 1992 he played for Second Bundesliga club SC Freiburg.

Los Angeles Salsa/St. Pauli
On May 4, 1995, Caliguiri returned to the United States from Germany to sign with the Los Angeles Salsa of the American Professional Soccer League to gain match fitness before the U.S. national team's games that summer. (The Salsa played the season however in the USISL Pro League.)  Caligiuri donated his entire salary from the Salsa to the victims of the Oklahoma City bombing.  In August, the Salsa loaned Caligiuri to Bundesliga club FC St. Pauli, where he appeared in 14 games. In January 1996, the team elected not to exercise an option in Caligiuri's contract.

Major League Soccer
Caligiuri returned to the United States, where he signed with the emergent Major League Soccer. Despite Caligiuri's stated position that a contract clause that dictated he play for his hometown Los Angeles Galaxy, MLS allocated Caligiuri to the Columbus Crew. During his lone season with the Crew, he scored 3 goals.  
Caligiuri sued Major League Soccer to play for the L.A. Galaxy, and in March 1997 was placed with Los Angeles for the 1997 season, despite his high salary and the fact that the Galaxy were close to the salary cap. He played there until his 2001 retirement, finishing his MLS career with nine goals and 14 assists accumulated during 135 games, including 123 starts.

Paul Caligiuri's final professional appearance (October 27, 2001) was in the 2001 U.S. Open Cup Final, where Caligiuri's LA Galaxy defeated the New England Revolution 2–1 in extra time.

International career
Caligiuri represented the U.S. at the 1983 Pan American Games. While at UCLA Caligiuri had earned his first cap for the national team, playing October 9, 1984 against El Salvador. Caligiuri eventually tallied 110 appearances for the United States, and scored five goals from his position in the midfield. Perhaps his biggest goal was in a 1989 World Cup qualifier in Trinidad and Tobago that gave the U.S. a 1–0 victory and sent the Americans to the World Cup finals for the first time in 40 years.

On March 14, 1990, Caligiuri signed a contract with USSF making him a full-time national team member.  He remained on contract with USSF for several years. In 1993, he briefly considered moving to a British or German club after being omitted from the U.S. team's Gold Cup roster, but ultimately chose to dedicate himself to the national team as it prepared for the 1994 World Cup.

Caligiuri was a central figure in the national team from the 1980s through the mid-1990s, and started every U.S. match in both the 1990 and 1994 World Cups. In 1997, he played his final game for the national team.

Caligiuri played with the U.S. Futsal team in 1996, earning four caps and scoring one goal.

International goals
Scores and results list the United States' goal tally first, score column indicates score after each Caligiuri goal.

Post-soccer career
Caligiuri was appointed head coach of both the men and women's soccer teams at Cal Poly Pomona before the beginning of their 2001 fall seasons, although he did not take over until 2002. He held the women's team's coaching position through the 2005 season and the men's team's coaching position through the end of the 2008 season.

Personal life
In 2004, Caligiuri was inducted into the U.S. National Soccer Hall of Fame. He serves as an athlete representative on the board of directors of the United States Soccer Federation. Caligiuri coached a BU-19 and GU-14 team for California Football Academy in Mission Viejo, California. He is currently an Area Director for the Pateadores Soccer Club. He is also the Head Coach for the Orange County Football Club, Men's Semi-Pro soccer team in the NPSL (National Premier Soccer League). This was OCFC's first season in the league where they ended the season in a 1–0 loss in the Western Conference Final of the NPSL.

See also
 List of men's footballers with 100 or more international caps

References

External links
 Video of goal versus Trinidad and Tobago
 National Soccer Hall of Fame bio

1964 births
Living people
People from Westminster, California
All-American men's college soccer players
1990 FIFA World Cup players
1991 CONCACAF Gold Cup players
1992 King Fahd Cup players
1993 Copa América players
1994 FIFA World Cup players
1995 Copa América players
1996 CONCACAF Gold Cup players
CONCACAF Gold Cup-winning players
American soccer players
American men's futsal players
American soccer coaches
American expatriate soccer players
American expatriate soccer players in Germany
American people of Italian descent
Expatriate footballers in East Germany
UCLA Bruins men's soccer players
Nomads Soccer Club players
Hamburger SV players
SV Meppen players
FC Hansa Rostock players
SC Freiburg players
Los Angeles Salsa U-23 players 
FC St. Pauli players
Columbus Crew players
LA Galaxy players
FIFA Century Club
NCAA Division I Men's Soccer Tournament Most Outstanding Player winners
Association football defenders
Association football midfielders
Association football utility players
Footballers at the 1988 Summer Olympics
National Soccer Hall of Fame members
Olympic soccer players of the United States
Soccer players from California
United States men's international soccer players
USL Second Division players
Western Soccer Alliance players
Bundesliga players
2. Bundesliga players
Major League Soccer players
Pan American Games competitors for the United States
Footballers at the 1983 Pan American Games
United States men's under-20 international soccer players
Columbus Crew draft picks
California State Polytechnic University, Pomona alumni
California State Polytechnic University, Pomona faculty
DDR-Oberliga players
People from Walnut, California
College men's soccer coaches in the United States
College women's soccer coaches in the United States
United Premier Soccer League coaches
American expatriate sportspeople in West Germany
Expatriate footballers in West Germany